Lethbridge District was a provincial electoral district in Alberta, Canada, mandated to return a single member to the Legislative Assembly of Alberta using the first-past-the-post method of voting from 1909 to 1913.

History
The Lethbridge District was created prior to the 1909 Provincial election from the Lethbridge electoral district, which was split into Lethbridge City and the Lethbridge district. At the 1909 Liberal convention, Dr. John H. Rivers, the Mayor of Raymond was selected as the Liberal candidate over W. W. Douglas, the Mayor of Taber.

Lethbridge District was short-lived, however, when prior to the 1913 Alberta general election, it was split into Little Bow and Taber electoral districts.

Election results

1909 general election

1910 by-election

By-election reasons
June 22, 1910—Sitting member A.J. McLean accepted office in provincial ministry, crossed the floor to the Liberal party.

See also
List of Alberta provincial electoral districts

References

Further reading

External links
Elections Alberta
The Legislative Assembly of Alberta

Former provincial electoral districts of Alberta
Politics of Lethbridge